The Mechanisms and Robotics Award is an honor that is given annually by the Mechanisms and Robotics Committee of the American Society of Mechanical Engineers (ASME), to engineers known for a lifelong contribution to the field of mechanism design or theory. This prestigious honor can only be given once to any individual. 

The award was established in 1974 and was awarded in even years at the ASME Biennial Mechanisms & Robotics Conference, until 2005 when the conference was made an annual event. The award is under the direction of the Design Engineering Division of ASME.

Past Award Recipients
Source: ASME

 2016: Sunil K. Agrawal
 2015: Jian S. Dai
 2014: Gregory S. Chirikjian
 2013: Steven Dubowsky
 2012: Vijay Kumar (roboticist) 
 2011: J. Michael McCarthy
 2009: Larry L. Howell 
 2008: C. Gosselin
 2007: C. W. Wampler, II
 2006: K. Kazerounian
 2005: J. K. Davidson
 2004: J. J. Uicker, Jr.
 2002: K.C. Gupta
 2000: J. Angeles
 1998: A. Midha
 1996: A. T. Yang
 1994: A. Soni
 1992: J. Duffy
 1990: K. J. Waldron
 1988: A. G. Erdman
 1986: K. H. Hunt
 1984: G. G. Lowen
 1982: B. Roth
 1980: G. N. Sandor
 1978: F. Freudenstein
 1976: F. R. E. Crossley
 1974: A. S. Hall, Jr., R. S. Hartenberg, and J. E. Shigley

See also

 List of mechanical engineering awards

References

Awards of the American Society of Mechanical Engineers
Robotics events
Awards established in 1974